Tigrett is an unincorporated community in Dyer County, Tennessee, United States. Its ZIP code is 38070.

Notes

Unincorporated communities in Dyer County, Tennessee
Unincorporated communities in Tennessee